Abdullahi Mohamed Ali "Sanbalolshe" is a Somali politician. He subsequently briefly served as the director of the National Intelligence and Security Agency in 2014,  In April 2017, Ali was reappointed as the director of NISA. 7 months later he was fired by Somali president Mohamed Abdullahi Farmajo.

He is currently a member of the federal parliament of Somalia.

Ali is from from the Ali Madaxweyne (Hassan Muse) Xawaadle subclan of the Hawiye.

Career
He was previously the Minister for National Security in the Transitional Federal Government. Ali later served as Somalia's Ambassador to the United Kingdom.

On 9 July 2014, following a security reform, Ali was appointed the new Director of the National Intelligence and Security Agency (NISA). He replaced Bashir Mohamed Jama at the position.

On 7 September 2014, the Federal Cabinet sacked Ali as NISA Director. He was replaced at the position by Abdurahman Mohamud Turyare, the former Chief of the Supreme Military Court.

References

Living people
Somalian politicians
Year of birth missing (living people)